This was the first edition of the tournament.

Fabiano de Paula and Mohamed Safwat won the title, defeating Richard Becker and Élie Rousset in the final, 6–2, 3–6, [10–6].

Seeds

Draw

Draw

References
 Main Draw

Morocco - Mohammedia - Doubles
2014 - Doubles
Mohammedia - Doubles